Silver Spring Library is a light rail station that is currently under construction. It will be part of the Purple Line in Maryland.

History 
The Silver Spring Library station was envisioned during the design of the Silver Spring Library. Space for the station was included in the construction of the library, which opened in 2015. The Purple Line system is under construction as of 2022 and is scheduled to open in 2026.

Station layout
The station consists of two side platforms.

References

Downtown Silver Spring, Maryland
Purple Line (Maryland)
Railway stations scheduled to open in 2026
Railway stations in Montgomery County, Maryland